580 most commonly refers to:

 580 (number), a number
 580 AD, a Gregorian calendar year
 580 BC, a Gregorian calendar year

580 may also refer to:

Communications
 580 AM, an AM radio frequency
 Area code 580, an area code in Oklahoma, United States

Electronics
 Dell Inspiron 580, a desktop computer
 Macintosh LC 580, a personal computer
 Sony Alpha 580, a midrange-level digital single-lens reflex camera

Places
 580 California Street, a high-rise office building in San Francisco, California, United States
 580 Selene, a minor planet orbiting the Sun

Transportation

Aircraft and spacecraft
 Arado E.580, a German World War II jet fighter design
 Caudron C.580, a French advanced trainer aircraft
 Convair CV-580, an American airliner
 Kosmos 580, a Soviet satellite
 Lycoming IO-580, an American horizontally opposed, six-cylinder aircraft engine
 Lycoming GSO-580, an American family of eight-cylinder horizontally opposed, supercharged, carburetor-equipped aircraft engines

Land vehicles
 Dongfeng Fengguang 580, a 2016–present Chinese compact SUV
 IVECO 580, an Italian suburban single-decker bus
 TR-580, a Romanian main battle tank

Watercraft
 USS Barbel (SS-580), the lead ship of the Barbel-class submarines in the United States Navy
 USS Shada (SP-580), a patrol vessel in the United States Navy

Roads and routes
 Interstate 580 (disambiguation), multiple freeways in the United States
 List of highways numbered 580

Rail
 Hong Lok Road stop, Hong Kong; digital code

Other uses
 Minuscule 580, a Greek minuscule manuscript
 Remington Model 580, an American bolt-action rifle